Board of Estimate of City of New York v. Morris, 489 U.S. 688 (1989), was a case argued before the United States Supreme Court regarding the structure of the New York City Board of Estimate.

Background
Under the charter of the City of Greater New York established in 1898, the Board of Estimate was responsible for budget and land-use decisions for the city. It was composed of eight ex officio members: the Mayor of New York City, the New York City Comptroller and the President of the New York City Council, each of whom was elected citywide and had two votes, and the five Borough presidents, each having one vote.

In 1981, attorney Richard Emery recruited three NYC women to file suit that the board was unconstitutional, an unpopular opinion at the time that lost in its first district court hearing. The ruling was later reversed on appeal, and the city's counter was picked up by the Supreme Court in 1988.

Opinion of the Court
The court unanimously declared the New York City Board of Estimate unconstitutional on the grounds that the city's most populous borough (Brooklyn) had no greater effective representation on the board than the city's least populous borough (Staten Island), in violation of the Fourteenth Amendment's Equal Protection Clause pursuant to the Court's 1964 "one man, one vote" decision (Reynolds v. Sims). The Board was disestablished.

The case was argued on December 7, 1988, and decided on March 22, 1989. Justice Byron White delivered the Court's opinion.

See also
 List of United States Supreme Court cases, volume 489
 List of United States Supreme Court cases
 Lists of United States Supreme Court cases by volume
 List of United States Supreme Court cases by the Rehnquist Court
 One Person, One Vote

References

Further reading

External links
 

United States Supreme Court cases
United States Supreme Court cases of the Rehnquist Court
United States equal protection case law
United States electoral redistricting case law
United States One Person, One Vote Legal Doctrine
Government of New York City
1989 in United States case law
City of New York litigation